Revold is a surname. Notable people with the surname include:

Axel Revold (1887–1962), Norwegian painter
Jens Revold (born 1948), Norwegian politician
, (1931–) Russian economist and academician